The 1972 Giro di Lombardia was the 66th edition of the Giro di Lombardia cycle race and was held on 7 October 1972. The race started in Milan and finished in Como. The race was won by Eddy Merckx of the Molteni team.

General classification

References

1972
Giro di Lombardia
Giro di Lombardia
Giro di Lombardia
1972 Super Prestige Pernod